Margaretta is a genus of bryozoans belonging to the family Margarettidae.

The genus has cosmopolitan distribution.

Species:

Margaretta amitabhae 
Margaretta amplipora 
Margaretta aquitanica 
Margaretta barbata 
Margaretta bipartita 
Margaretta buski 
Margaretta cereoides 
Margaretta chuakensis 
Margaretta coeca 
Margaretta congesta 
Margaretta fallax 
Margaretta filiformis 
Margaretta fusiformis 
Margaretta gracilior 
Margaretta gracilis 
Margaretta guhai 
Margaretta hariparensis 
Margaretta levinseni 
Margaretta longicollis 
Margaretta nodifera 
Margaretta opuntioides 
Margaretta parviporosa 
Margaretta pentaceratops 
Margaretta punctata 
Margaretta rajui 
Margaretta tenuis 
Margaretta triplex 
Margaretta turgida 
Margaretta vicksburgica 
Margaretta watersi

References

Bryozoan genera